Danggok Station is a station on Sillim Line. It is located in Bongcheon-dong, Gwanak-gu, Seoul.

References

Seoul Metropolitan Subway stations
Railway stations opened in 2022
Metro stations in Gwanak District